Isisaurus (named after the Indian Statistical Institute) is a genus of titanosaurian dinosaur from the Late Cretaceous Lameta Formation of India and Pab Formation of Pakistan. The genus contains a single species, Isisaurus colberti.

Discovery and Naming
The type specimen of Isisaurus colberti, ISI R 335/1-65, was originally described and named as Titanosaurus colberti by Sohan Lal Jain and Saswati Bandyopadhyay in 1997. The specific name honours Edwin Harris Colbert. In 2003, the fossils were designated as belonging to its own genus by Wilson and Upchurch. The generic name, "Isisaurus," combines a reference to the Indian Statistical Institute (ISI) with the Greek "saurus," meaning "lizard." It had a short, vertically directed neck and long forelimbs, making it considerably different from other sauropods. The humerus is 148 centimetres long.

Isisaurus is known from better remains than many other titanosaurs that were known at the time of its description. Much of its postcranial skeleton is known. The skeletal material found by Jain and Bandyopadhyay between 1984 and 1986 was "in associated and mostly articulated condition." The holotype includes cervical, dorsal, sacral and caudal vertebrae, ribs, pelvis, scapula, coracoid, left forelimb and other bones. No skull, hindlimb, or foot bones are known. Since the original description of Isisaurus, titanosaur fossils belonging to more complete individuals have been discovered.

The site locality is Dongargaon Hill, which is in a Maastrichtian crevasse splay claystone in the Lameta Formation of India. Dongargaon Hill (20.212318N,79.090709E) is located near Warora, in Chandrapur District, Maharashtra.

A braincase referrable to the species is known from the Pab Formation of Pakistan, which is equivalent in age to the Lameta Formation.

Description
Two types of sauropod skulls are known from the Maastrichtian of India. The first type is from the coeval Jainosaurus, and the other is from Isisaurus. While Jainosaurus had a broad and flat cranium, the skull of Isisaurus was more robust and compact. Additionally, the angle between the occipital bone and occipital condyle is different in the two taxa. In the specimen from Dongargaon it is equal to 120°. In that matter, the cranium of Isisaurus resembles the skulls of Diplodocus and Apatosaurus (genera belonging to the Diplodocidae), but the bone modifications are different.

Palaeobiology
Fungus in coprolites believed to have been voided by Isisaurus indicate that it ate leaves from several species of tree, since these fungi are known to be pathogens which infect tree leaves.

Paleoecology
Isisaurus lived in the area belonging nowadays to India during the Maastrichtian age of the Cretaceous period. Its remains are the most complete among the Cretaceous dinosaurs known from that region. Khosla et al. (2003) listed the following Indian sauropods:
 Titanosaurus indicus
 T. blanfordi
 T. rahiolensis
 Jainosaurus septentrionalis.

Wilson et al. (2009) listed only two Indian titanosaurs, Isisaurus and its distant relative, Jainosaurus. Isisaurus and Jainosaurus lived sympatrically in the area of middle and western India. Isisaurus fossils have also been reported from western Pakistan.

Other dinosaurs, including the abelisaurs Indosuchus, Rahiolisaurus, and Rajasaurus, also existed in the Lameta Formation.

References

Lithostrotians
Late Cretaceous dinosaurs
Dinosaurs of India and Madagascar
Fossil taxa described in 2003
Taxa named by Sohan Lal Jain